Dicellitis nigritula is a species of moth of the family Tortricidae. It is found in India (Coorg) and Nepal.

References

Moths described in 1908
Archipini